Murder Mountain may refer to:

 "Murder Mountain", the nickname for the Rancho Sequoia area of Alderpoint, California
 Murder Mountain, a documentary series on Netflix
 Murder Mountain, a record label in Bellingham, Washington